Team Pentacle is an India-based paranormal research organisation that uses a blended approach of scientific methods and religious beliefs. It was founded in 2013 by a group who collaborated despite different work-streams and varied diversities, to work towards a single goal "to edify and illuminate the mankind" about the hidden/unknown world of one's own fear. The goal of the team is to bring to light what it sees as the unbiased and irrefutable facts about the realm of the unknown and other-worldly phenomena, in turn preserving the quintessence of the ancient secrets and modern mysteries.

History
Team Pentacle was established in Mumbai on January 1, 2013, by Shishir Kumar and the UFOlogist Ayush Raina, the psychic Rohit Kumar, the "healer" Chinmaya Tiwari and the investigator Nisha Verma. It was initially called Institute of Paranormal Research and UFOlogy in India. It now has two more wings - The Ascended Masters Society of India and Centre for Tantra and Spirituality in India.

Operation
Headquartered in Mumbai under the direction of Kumar, Team Pentacle is operational all over India, with more than 100 members from almost all states. It has operational units in the New Delhi, Bangaluru and Ranchi.

Mission
The stated mission of Team Pentacle is to edify and illuminate people about the hidden world of the paranormal and UFOlogy and to breakt the myths and dogma under which India is covered these days. In India, this is confined to a sect of people who think are the masters without any proper practical knowledge. As well said in around the world : the true knowing people are always hidden and are rarely found in the open market. The organization has taken up this task to gain knowledge from those hidden sects and transfer it to all.

In the media
Some of Team Pentacle's investigations have been covered on television and in leading daily paper in India.

References

2013 establishments in India